The Lesedi Solar Park is a 75-megawatt (MW) solar photovoltaic power plant in Kimberley, Northern Cape, South Africa.  The solar park with 277,632 PV solar panels which went fully on line in May 2014, and will supply electricity for 65,000 homes, while reducing the use of pollution-generating fossil fuels.

References 

Photovoltaic power stations in South Africa
Economy of the Northern Cape
Kimberley, Northern Cape